Diaphoretickes  is a major group of eukaryotic organisms, with over 400,000 species.  The majority of the earth's biomass that carries out photosynthesis belongs to Diaphoretickes.

Diaphoretickes includes the following groups: 

Where Chromista is used as a taxon, its member groups (SAR supergroup, and "Hacrobia" – Cryptistia and Haptista) all fall within Diaphoretickes.

In 2012 Diaphoretickes received the following phylogenetic definition:
"The most inclusive clade containing Bigelowiella natans Moestrup & Sengco 2001 (Rhizaria), Tetrahymena thermophila Nanney & McCoy 1976 (Alveolata), Thalassiosira pseudonana Cleve 1873 (Stramenopiles), and Arabidopsis thaliana (Linnaeus) Heynhold, 1842 (Archaeplastida), but not Homo sapiens Linnaeus 1758 (Opisthokonta), Dictyostelium discoideum Raper 1935 (Amoebozoa) or Euglena gracilis Klebs 1883 (Excavata). This is a branch-based definition in which all of the specifiers are extant."

The placement of Hemimastigophora is uncertain.  Some studies find it nested within the clades of Diaphoretickes, as the best supported hypothesis or a less-supported one.  Others find it to be the sister group of all other Diaphoretickes, which under the branch-based definition falls within Diaphoretickes.

Taxonomic history 
Diaphoretickes was identified by Burki et al. (2008) as the 
"plants+HC+SAR megagroup".
because it included plants (Archaeplastida), haptophytes, cryptomonads, and stramenopiles, alveolates, and rhizarians.

Diaphoretickes has also been referred to as the SAR/HA Supergroup or "Corticata with Rhizaria".

According to this description, it includes most of the species engaging in photosynthesis, except for the Euglenozoa and Cyanobacteria. It includes all Bikonts that are not excavates and Hemimastigophora. 

The name "Corticata" comes from Cavalier-Smith's hypothesis about the common origin of the cortical alveoli of glaucophytes and alveolates.

The megagroup was previously described as the sum of Archaeplastida, Rhizaria, and chromalveolates. However, this description is obsolete, largely due to the discovery that chromalveolata is not monophyletic.

References 

 

Bikont unranked clades